WTZN (1310 AM) is an oldies radio station in Troy, Pennsylvania, United States.

FM Translator
In addition to the main station on 1310 kHz, WTZN programming is also relayed to an FM translator in order to widen its broadcast area and to provide the listener with choice of FM with high fidelity sound.  The translator is owned by Cantroair Communications, Inc.

External links

TZN
Radio stations established in 1959